Darrell Hunter, Jr. (born November 29, 1983) is a former American football cornerback. He was signed by the Arizona Cardinals as an undrafted free agent in 2006. He played college football at Miami (Ohio).

Hunter has also been a member of the Indianapolis Colts, New Orleans Saints and Edmonton Eskimos.

External links
Just Sports Stats
Miami RedHawks bio 
Tampa Bay Buccaneers bio

1983 births
Living people
Sportspeople from Middletown, Ohio
Players of American football from Ohio
American football cornerbacks
American players of Canadian football
Canadian football defensive backs
Miami RedHawks football players
Arizona Cardinals players
Tampa Bay Buccaneers players
Indianapolis Colts players
New Orleans Saints players
Edmonton Elks players
Florida Tuskers players
Sportspeople from the Cincinnati metropolitan area